Blanus is a genus of amphisbaenians found in the Mediterranean region of Europe and North Africa. Their skulls are powerfully constructed, allowing them to push through soil to create a burrow. Their jaws are well-developed, with large, recurved teeth and a pair of canine-like teeth in the upper jaw.

Five extant species are currently known. The relationships of Blanus to other worm-lizards are not clear. The genus was formerly included in the Amphisbaenidae. More recent analyses suggest that blanids are more primitive, and are either related to Bipes or represent an even more ancient lineage.

A number of fossils from Europe have been referred either to Blanus or to the Blanidae.

Species

The genus contains the following species:
 Blanus alexandri Sindaco, Kornilios, Sacchi & Lymberakis, 2014 
 Blanus aporus Werner, 1898 
 Blanus cinereus (Vandelli, 1797) – Iberian worm lizard 
 Blanus mariae Albert & Fernández, 2009
 Blanus mendezi† Bolet et al., 2014
 Blanus mettetali Bons, 1963 – Moroccan worm lizard 
 Blanus strauchi (Bedriaga, 1884) – Turkish worm lizard
 Blanus tingitanus Busack, 1988

References

 
Lizard genera
Taxa named by Johann Georg Wagler
Taxonomy articles created by Polbot